The Cowboy and the Flapper is a 1924 American silent Western film directed by Alan James and starring Alan James and starring William Fairbanks, Dorothy Revier and Jack Richardson.

Cast
 William Fairbanks as Dan Patterson
 Dorothy Revier as Alice Allison
 Jack Richardson as Red Carson
 Milton Ross as Col. Allison
 Morgan Davis as Deputy Jack Harrison
 Andrew Waldron as Al Lyman
 Fred Haynes as Handsome Ed Burns

References

External links
 

1924 films
1924 Western (genre) films
American black-and-white films
Films directed by Alan James
Silent American Western (genre) films
1920s English-language films
1920s American films